The 1991 Corby District Council election took place on 2 May 1991 to elect members of Corby District Council in Northamptonshire, England. This was on the same day as other local elections. The Labour Party retained overall control of the council, which it had held since 1979.

Ward-by-Ward Results

Central Ward (3 seats)

Danesholme Ward (3 seats)

East Ward (2 seats)

Hazelwood Ward (3 seats)

Kingswood Ward (3 seats)

Lloyds Ward (3 seats)

Lodge Park Ward (3 seats)

Rural East Ward (1 seat)

Rural North Ward (1 seat)

Rural West Ward (1 seat)

Shire Lodge Ward (2 seats)

West Ward (2 seats)

References

1991 English local elections
1991
1990s in Northamptonshire